The 1904 Newfoundland general election was held on 31 October 1904 to elect members of the 20th General Assembly of Newfoundland in the Newfoundland Colony. The Liberal Party led by Robert Bond formed the government.

Results by party 

*As Opposition

Elected members
 Bay de Verde
 William C. Winsor Conservative
 Charles H. Hutchings Liberal
 Bonavista Bay
 Alfred B. Morine Conservative
 Donald Morison Conservative, elected in 1906
 Mark Chaplin Conservative
 Sydney Blandford Conservative
 Burgeo-LaPoile
 Robert Moulton Conservative
 Burin
 Edward Henry Davey Liberal
 Henry Gear, Liberal
 Carbonear
 John Maddick Liberal
 Ferryland
 Michael P. Cashin Liberal
 William J. Ellis Liberal
 Fogo
 Henry Earle Liberal
 Fortune Bay
 A. H. Martin Liberal
 Harbour Grace
 Eli Dawe Liberal
 W. A. Oke Liberal
 Arthur Barnes Liberal
 Harbour Main
 Frank J. Morris Liberal (speaker)
 J. Lewis Liberal
 Placentia and St. Mary's
 Edward M. Jackman Liberal
 Thomas Bonia Liberal
 Michael S. Sullivan Liberal
 Port de Grave
 Alexander McKay Conservative
 Charles Dawe Conservative, elected in 1906
 St. Barbe
 William M. Clapp Liberal
 St. George's
 George T. Carty Liberal
 St. John's East
 James M. Kent Liberal
 George Shea Liberal
 J. Dwyer Liberal
 St. John's West
 Edward P. Morris Liberal
 John R. Bennett Liberal
 J. P. Scott Liberal
 Trinity Bay
 George W. Gushue Liberal
 William F. Lloyd Liberal
 A. W. Miller Liberal
 Twillingate
 Robert Bond Liberal
 James A. Clift Liberal
 George Roberts Liberal

References 
 

1904
1904 elections in North America
1904 elections in Canada
Pre-Confederation Newfoundland
1904 in Newfoundland
October 1904 events